The 1999–2000 Kansas Jayhawks men's basketball team represented the University of Kansas in the 1999–2000 NCAA Division I men's basketball season, which was the Jayhawks' 102nd basketball season. The head coach was Roy Williams, who served his 12th year at KU. The team played its home games in Allen Fieldhouse in Lawrence, Kansas.

Roster

Big 12 Conference standings

Schedule 

|-
!colspan=9 style=| Regular season
|-

|-
!colspan=9 style=| Big 12 Tournament

|-
!colspan=9 style=| NCAA tournament

Rankings 

*There was no coaches poll in week 1.

References 

Kansas Jayhawks men's basketball seasons
Kansas
Kansas
Jay
Jay